Governor Brown or Browne may refer to:

Aaron V. Brown (1795–1859), 11th Governor of Tennessee
Albert G. Brown (1813–1880), 14th Governor of Mississippi
Albert O. Brown (1852–1937), 58th Governor of New Hampshire
Alfred Winsor Brown (1885–1938), 31st Naval Governor of Guam
Benjamin Gratz Brown (1826–1885), 20th Governor of Missouri
Daniel Russell Brown (1848–1919), 43rd Governor of Rhode Island
Ethan Allen Brown (1776–1852), 7th Governor of Ohio
Frank Brown (governor) (1846–1920), 42nd Governor of Maryland
Fred H. Brown (1879–1955), 59th Governor of New Hampshire
George Brown (Governor of Bombay) (fl. 1810s), Governor of Bombay from 1811 to 1812
Jerry Brown (born 1938), 34th and 39th Governor of California, son of Pat Brown
John Y. Brown (politician, born 1835) (1835–1904), 31st Governor of Kentucky
John Y. Brown Jr. (born 1933), 55th Governor of Kentucky
John C. Brown (1827–1889), 19th Governor of Tennessee
John William Brown (1913–1993), 58th Governor of Ohio
Joseph E. Brown (1821–1894), Governor of Georgia
Joseph Mackey Brown (1851–1932), Governor of Georgia, son of Joseph E. Brown
Kate Brown (born 1960), Governor of Oregon
Montfort Browne (fl. 1760–1780), 4th Governor of British West Florida
Neill S. Brown (1810–1886), 42nd Governor of Tennessee
Pat Brown (1905–1996), 32nd Governor of California
Thomas Brown (Florida politician) (1785–1867), 2nd Governor of Florida
Thomas Gore Browne (1807–1887), Governor of Saint Helena from 1851 to 1854, 4th Governor of New Zealand, 2nd Governor of Tasmania